Line drawing may mean:

Line art, a style of two-dimensional art featuring only two, unshaded, contrasting colors
Line drawing algorithm, in computer graphics

See also
Box-drawing character, also known as a line-drawing character